Pseudoalteromonas aurantia is an antibacterial-producing  marine bacterium commonly found in Mediterranean waters. In 1979, Gauthier and Breittmayer first named it Alteromonas aurantia to include it in the genus Alteromonas that was described seven years earlier, in 1972 by Baumann et al. In 1995, Gauthier et al renamed Alteromonas aurantia to Pseudoalteromonas aurantia to include it in their proposed new genus, Pseudoalteromonas,  which they recommended splitting from Alteromonas.

References

External links

Type strain of Pseudoalteromonas aurantia at BacDive -  the Bacterial Diversity Metadatabase

Alteromonadales
Bacteria described in 1995